The Doubles luge competition at the 1984 Winter Olympics in Sarajevo was held on 15 February, at Sarajevo Olympic Bobsleigh and Luge Track.

Results

References

Luge at the 1984 Winter Olympics
Men's events at the 1984 Winter Olympics